Benson Masanda is a Ugandan former amateur boxer who won a gold medal at the 1970 British Commonwealth Games and bronze  at the 1974 edition.

References

External links
Benson Masanda at Commonwealth Games Federation

Year of birth missing (living people)
Living people
Ugandan male boxers
Heavyweight boxers
Commonwealth Games medallists in boxing
Commonwealth Games gold medallists for Uganda
Commonwealth Games bronze medallists for Uganda
Boxers at the 1970 British Commonwealth Games
Boxers at the 1974 British Commonwealth Games
Medallists at the 1970 British Commonwealth Games
Medallists at the 1974 British Commonwealth Games